The Fonda Theatre (formerly Music Box Theatre, Guild Theatre,  Fox Theatre, and  Pix Theatre) is a concert venue located on Hollywood Boulevard in Los Angeles, California. Designed in the Spanish Colonial Revival Style, the  theater has hosted live events, films, and radio broadcasts.

History
On October 20, 1926, the Carter DeHaven Music Box opened with a revue called Fancy.  It had been planned to open the theatre two days earlier however a postponement was caused by the illness of Arthur Kay, a principal actor.  Among the first investors in the new theater were John Barrymore, John Gilbert, Reginald Denny, King Vidor, and Mae Murray.

The Music Box switched from revues to legitimate theater in 1927 with the west coast première of Chicago, starring Clark Gable and Nancy Carroll.  Stage plays continued at the Music Box for nearly two decades—aside from a period beginning in 1936 when the site was used as a broadcasting studio by Lux Radio Theater.

In 1945, Fox West Coast purchased the building and remodeled it for film exhibition in a Streamline Moderne decor, which included covering the Spanish Colonial Revival façade with sheet metal.  Opening in February 1945, the theater showed movies for 32 years; first as the Guild Theatre, then as the Fox Theatre, and finally as the Pix Theatre, before closing its doors in 1977.

The Nederlander Organization reopened the house as a legitimate theater in 1985 and renamed it in honor of film and stage actor Henry Fonda.  In ensuing years, productions such as the Pulitzer Prize winning play Glengarry Glen Ross, and Driving Miss Daisy graced the stage.

Efforts to restore the theater to its Roaring Twenties glory began in 2002, culminating in the original name being placed back on the marquee.  In 2012, Goldenvoice took over the Music Box and changed the name back to The Fonda Theatre. The theater was named the top venue in Los Angeles by LA Weekly in 2015.

Avenged Sevenfold filmed a music video for the song "Unholy Confessions" on March 6, 2004 at the Fonda Theatre.

The Bachelor was filmed live at the Fonda Theatre on January 7, 2019.

Hosted the 2022 Streamer Awards, Hosted by QTCinderella and Maya Higa

References

Theatres in Hollywood, Los Angeles
Hollywood Boulevard
Cinemas and movie theaters in Hollywood, Los Angeles
Music venues in Los Angeles
Theatres completed in 1926